Matthew (Matt) John McKeon (born September 24, 1974) is an American retired soccer midfielder who played seven seasons in Major League Soccer.  He earned two caps with the United States men's national soccer team and was a member of the 1996 U.S. Olympic soccer team.

Youth
McKeon was born in St. Louis, Missouri. McKeon graduated from De Smet Jesuit High School where he was a Parade Magazine High School All American soccer player his senior season. He was also the 1992 Gatorade Boys Soccer Player of the Year. A product of Saint Louis University, where he was a 1994 and 1995 First Team All-American.  In 1996, the Missouri Athletic Club awarded him the Hermann Trophy.

McKeon is one of 22 college players to be part of the 40-40 club, having both 40 goals and 40 assists in their college career.

Professional
On March 4, 1996, McKeon was the first pick in the 1996 MLS College Draft, going to the Kansas City Wizards. He was known as a tough defender, and led the league in fouls committed during the 1997 season. The Wizards traded him to the Colorado Rapids for Chris Henderson in November 1998.   A year later, the Rapids traded him and Peter Vermes to the Wizards for Scott Vermillion, an allocation, and an exchange of draft picks. McKeon was a "salary cap casualty" in the 02/03 offseason, being cut from the team despite strong play. In seven seasons in MLS, McKeon scored 13 goals and 19 assists in league play.

International
McKeon earned two caps with the United States national team, both at the 1999 Confederations Cup, his first coming on July 30 against Germany. He also played at the 1996 Summer Olympics.

McKeon currently is the boys youth director of soccer and coaches several teams for Sporting JB Marine Soccer Club in St. Louis.

References

External links
 MLS: Matt McKeon
 SoccerTimes.com:  Matt McKeon

1974 births
Living people
All-American men's college soccer players
American soccer players
Soccer players from St. Louis
Saint Louis University alumni
Saint Louis Billikens men's soccer players
Major League Soccer first-overall draft picks
Major League Soccer players
Sporting Kansas City players
Colorado Rapids players
United States men's international soccer players
Olympic soccer players of the United States
Footballers at the 1996 Summer Olympics
1999 FIFA Confederations Cup players
Major League Soccer All-Stars
United States men's under-20 international soccer players
United States men's under-23 international soccer players
Sporting Kansas City draft picks
Association football midfielders